Rafard is a municipality in the state of São Paulo in Brazil. The population is 9,101 (2020 est.) in an area of 122 km². The elevation is 515 m. Before 1965, when it became an independent municipality, it was part of Capivari.

As of 2012, the Prefect of Rafard is Márcio Minamioka. The Vice-Prefect is Heitor Turolla.

People
Tarsila do Amaral (1886–1973), painter. Born in the area of Fazenda São Bernardo.
Paulo Betti (1952–), actor, film producer and director.

References

Municipalities in São Paulo (state)